Big Executive is a 1933 American Pre-Code drama film directed by Erle C. Kenton and written by Alice Duer Miller and Laurence Stallings. The film stars Ricardo Cortez, Richard Bennett, Elizabeth Young, Sharon Lynn, Dorothy Peterson, Barton MacLane and Charles Middleton. The film was released on August 8, 1933, by Paramount Pictures.

Cast 
Ricardo Cortez as Victor Conway
Richard Bennett as Commodore Richardson
Elizabeth Young as Helena Richardson
Sharon Lynn as Miss Dolly Healy
Dorothy Peterson as Mrs. Sarah Conway
Barton MacLane as Harry the Guide
Charles Middleton as Sheriff 
Tenen Holtz as Pawnbroker

References

External links 
 

1933 films
American drama films
1933 drama films
Paramount Pictures films
Films directed by Erle C. Kenton
American black-and-white films
1930s English-language films
1930s American films